Pico Espejo (Mirror Peak) is a mountain in the Andes of Venezuela. Near its peak is the fifth and final station of the Mérida cable car, which is now back in service after renovations.

See also
 List of mountains in the Andes

References

Espejo
Sierra Nevada National Park (Venezuela)